Another Eternity (stylized in lowercase letters) is the second studio album by Canadian electronic music duo Purity Ring. It was released on February 27, 2015, by 4AD.

Release and promotion
In February 2014, the duo announced that they were working on a second studio album. "Push Pull" was released as the first single from the album on December 3, 2014. On January 13, 2015, the album's second single, "Begin Again", was released, along with the formal reveal of the album's title, cover, and track listing. On January 23, 2015, Roddick played "Repetition" and "Bodyache" during a DJ set on Pitchfork Radio. "Bodyache" was released as the album's third single on February 26, 2015.

The music video of "Begin Again" was released exclusively through Apple Music on October 12, 2015.

Track listing

Personnel
Credits adapted from the liner notes of Another Eternity.

Purity Ring
 Corin Roddick – production, recording
 Megan James – production, recording, vocals

Additional personnel
 Maddox Chhimm – mixing
 Alison Fielding – layout
 Tallulah Fontaine – artwork, layout
 Cecil Frena – co-production 
 Jaycen Joshua – mixing
 Ryan Kaul – mixing
 Dave Kutch – mastering
 Renata Raksha – layout, photography

Charts

Weekly charts

Year-end charts

Release history

References

2015 albums
4AD albums
Last Gang Records albums
Purity Ring (band) albums